Apenes parallela is a species of ground beetle in the family Carabidae.

Subspecies
These three subspecies belong to the species Apenes parallela:
 Apenes parallela inaguae Darlington, 1953
 Apenes parallela parallela (Dejean, 1825)
 Apenes parallela sublaevis Darlington, 1934

References

Further reading

 

Harpalinae
Articles created by Qbugbot
Beetles described in 1825